{{Infobox officeholder
| honorific-prefix    = 
| name                = Gregor Strasser
| image               = Bundesarchiv Bild 119-1721, Gregor Strasser crop.jpg
| image_size          = 
| caption             = 
| office              = Organisationsabteilung Leiter, laterReichsorganisationsleiter NSDAP
| term_start          = 2 January 1928
| term_end            = 8 December 1932
| predecessor         = General Bruno Heinemann
| successor           = Adolf HitlerRobert Ley
| office2             = Reichspropagandaleiter NSDAP
| term_start2         = 16 September 1926
| term_end2           = 2 January 1928
| predecessor2        = Otto May
| successor2          = Adolf Hitler
| office3             = Gauleiter of Lower Bavaria;Lower Bavaria-Upper Palatinate;Lower Bavaria
| term_start3         = 26 February 1925
| term_end3           = 1 November 1929
| predecessor3        = Position established
| successor3          = Otto Erbersdobler (Lower Bavaria)Adolf Wagner (Upper Palatinate)
| office4             = Member of the Reichstag
| term_start4         = 7 December 1924
| term_end4           = March 1933
| constituency4       = Upper Bavaria
| office5             = Member of the Bavarian Landtag
| term_start5         = 4 May 1924
| term_end5           = 7 December 1924
| constituency5       = Pfaffenhofen
| birth_date          = 
| birth_place         = Geisenfeld, Bavaria, German Empire
| death_date          = 
| death_place         = Berlin, Nazi Germany 
| party               = Völkischer Block Nazi Party 
| profession          = Pharmacist
| allegiance          = 
| branch              = 
| unit                = Freikorps| rank                = Oberleutnant
| serviceyears        = 1914–1919
| battles             = World War IGerman Revolution
| mawards             = Iron Cross
}}
Gregor Strasser (also , see ß; 31 May 1892 – 30 June 1934) was an early prominent German Nazi official and politician who was murdered during the Night of the Long Knives in 1934. Born in 1892 in Bavaria, Strasser served in World War I in an artillery regiment, rising to the rank of first lieutenant. He joined the Nazi Party (NSDAP) in 1920 and quickly became an influential and important figure. In 1923, he took part in the abortive Beer Hall Putsch in Munich and was imprisoned, but released early for political reasons. Strasser joined a revived NSDAP in 1925 and once again established himself as a powerful and dominant member, hugely increasing the party's membership and reputation in northern Germany. Personal and political conflicts with Adolf Hitler led to his death in 1934 during the Night of the Long Knives.

Early life
Gregor Strasser was born on 31 May 1892 into the family of a Catholic judicial officer who lived in the Upper Bavarian market town of Geisenfeld. He grew up alongside his younger brother Otto, who was considered the more intellectual of the two. He attended the local Gymnasium and after his final examinations, served an apprenticeship as a pharmacist in the Lower Bavarian village of Frontenhausen from 1910 until 1914.

World War I
When war broke out in Europe in 1914, Strasser suspended his studies at Ludwig Maximilian University of Munich to enlist as a volunteer in the German Imperial Army. He served in the 1st Bavarian Field Artillery Regiment, rising to the rank of Oberleutnant and winning the Iron Cross of both classes for bravery. In 1918, he resumed his studies at Friedrich-Alexander-University, Erlangen-Nuremberg. He passed his state examination in 1919 and in 1920, he started work as a pharmacist in Landshut.

Paramilitary career
In 1919, Strasser and his brother joined the right-wing Freikorps led by Franz Ritter von Epp. The aim of the group was to suppress communism in Bavaria. He established and commanded the Sturmbataillon Niederbayern ("Storm Battalion Lower Bavaria"), with the young Heinrich Himmler employed as his adjutant. Strasser was well known for his enormous stature, commanding personality, and boundless organizational energy. By March 1920, Strasser's Freikorps was ready to participate in the failed Kapp Putsch, whereas his brother Otto had turned to the left of the political spectrum and helped combat this right-wing coup d'état.

The Strasser brothers advocated an anti-capitalist social revolutionary course for the NSDAP, which at the same time was also strongly antisemitic and anti-communist.

Political career

Nazi Party activities
By 1920, Strasser, and his paramilitary group had joined forces with Adolf Hitler's Nazi Party (NSDAP), another far-right political party seated in Munich. During the autumn of 1922, Strasser officially became a member of the NSDAP and the SA. Strasser's leadership qualities were soon recognized and he was appointed as regional head of the Sturmabteilung ("Storm Detachment"; SA) in Lower Bavaria. In November 1923, he took an active part in the unsuccessful Beer Hall Putsch, a coup attempt by Hitler and Ludendorff against the Weimar Republic. He was tried with other putschists shortly after Hitler's trial, convicted of aiding and abetting high treason—his actual arrest was for attempting to recruit soldiers for the NSDAP, which had been outlawed—on 12 May and sentenced to 15 months imprisonment and a small fine.

After a few weeks Strasser was released because he had been elected a member of the Bavarian Landtag for the NSDAP-associated "Völkischer Block" on 6 April and 4 May (in the Palatinate) 1924, respectively. In December 1924 Strasser won a seat for the "völkisch" National Socialist Freedom Movement in the Reichstag. He represented the constituency Westphalia North.

After the restoration of the NSDAP by Adolf Hitler on 26 February 1925, Strasser became the first Gauleiter of Lower Bavaria. Because Strasser led up to 2,000 men in Landshut and was overworked, he began looking for an assistant. Heinrich Himmler, who obtained the job, was tasked with expanding the organization in Lower Bavaria. In December 1926, Strasser's Gau merged with that of the Upper Palatinate and Strasser headed the enlarged Gau. After a subsequent partition on 1 October 1928, the Upper Palatinate was taken over by Adolf Wagner while Strasser continued as Gauleiter of Lower Bavaria until 1 March 1929.

Role in the Nazi Party's national organisation
After 1925, Strasser's organizational skills helped transform the Nazi Party from a marginal south-German splinter party into a nationwide party with mass appeal. Due to the public-speaking ban issued against Hitler, Strasser had been deputized (by Hitler) to represent the party in the north and speak. Through much of 1925, Strasser took full advantage of his liberties as a member of the Reichstag; using his free railroad passes, he traveled extensively throughout northern and western Germany appointing Gauleiters, setting up party branches, and delivering numerous public speeches. Lacking Hitler's oratorical gifts to move the masses, Strasser's personality alone was nonetheless sufficient to influence an audience. His concerted efforts helped the northern party so much that before the end of 1925, there were some 272 local NSDAP chapters compared to the 71 that existed before the failed putsch. Strasser's brand of socialism is discernible from a speech he made to the Reichstag in November 1925:

Strasser established the Party in northern and western Germany as a strong political association, one which attained a larger membership than Hitler's southern party section. The party's own foreign organization was also formed on Strasser's initiative. He also founded the National Socialist Working Association on 10 September 1925. This was a short-lived group of about a dozen northern and western German Gauleiter, who supported the more "socialist" wing of the Party and sought to increase its appeal to the working class in Germany's large industrial cities. Together with his brother Otto, Strasser founded the Berlin Kampf-Verlag ("Combat Publishing") in March 1926, which went on to publish the weekly newspaper the Berliner Arbeiterzeitung ("Berlin Workers Newspaper"), which represented the more "socialist" wing of the Party. Strasser appointed the young university-educated political agitator from the Rhineland, Joseph Goebbels as the managing editor of the Kampfverlag, a man who was drawn to the NSDAP political message and to Strasser himself. The two men drafted a revised version of the NSDAP political program during the winter of 1925–1926, one which leaned much further to the left and incensed Hitler. To deal with these proposed changes head-on, Hitler called for a meeting in the northern Bavarian city of Bamberg on 14 February 1926. Goebbels and Strasser traveled there hoping to convince Hitler of the new message. During the speech at the Bamberg Conference, Hitler lambasted the extreme ideas in the new draft, ideas which he conflated more with Bolshevism, a development which profoundly shocked and disappointed Strasser and Goebbels. Strasser's follow-on speech was bumbled and ineffectual, the result of Hitler's powerful oration; Hitler's refutation of Strasser's policy suggestions at Bamberg demonstrated that the party had officially become Hitler's and the NSDAP centered around him.

Placating the northern German NSDAP branches in the wake of Bamberg, Hitler assigned leadership of the SA, which was temporarily vacated by Ernst Roehm, to one of Strasser's own key members, Franz Pfeffer von Salomon. More importantly perhaps, Hitler began a personal campaign to lure away Strasser's chief lieutenant, Goebbels, into his personal fold—a move which proved immediately successful. The future Führer also struck a deal with Strasser to disband the National Socialist Working Association and asked him to assume responsibility for the party propaganda department. Strasser accepted this position, but a car accident in March 1926 proved a setback: he was bedridden as a result. Upon recovery, he was welcomed back into this position. Thus, in addition to his Gauleiter responsibilities, from 16 September 1926 until 2 January 1928, he was the NSDAP's national leader for propaganda (Reichspropagandaleiter). Strasser left his propaganda post to take up new responsibilities as Chairman of the NSDAP Organizational Committee, later, the Organizational Department (Organisationsableitung).
       
Between 1928–1932, Hitler turned over the NSDAP's national organizational work to Strasser, whose skills were better suited to the task, as Hitler was uninterested in organizational matters and preferred to give his attention to ideological concerns. By June 1932, Strasser was named Reichsorganisationsleiter, and had further centralized the Party's organizational structure under his command. During the course of the reorganizations, Strasser refashioned the NSDAP district boundaries to more closely align with those of the Reichstag and increased the authority of Gauleiters. Strasser reorganized both the party's regional structure and its vertical management hierarchy. The party became a more centralized organization with extensive propaganda mechanisms. In the 1928 General Election on 20 May, Strasser was elected from electoral constituency 26 (Franconia) as one of the first 12 Nazi deputies to the Reichstag. While the NSDAP only received 2.6 percent of the national vote that year, it became the second largest party in the Reichstag by September 1930, securing 18.3 percent of the vote. Strasser's organizational strengthening contributed to this success and the Nazis became the largest party in July 1932 with 37.3%.

Conflicts with Hitler
The Great Depression greatly affected Germany and by 1930 there was a dramatic increase in unemployment. During this time, the Strasser brothers started publishing a new regional daily newspaper in Berlin, the Nationaler Sozialist. Like their other publications, it conveyed the brothers' own brand of Nazism, including nationalism, anti-capitalism, social reform, and anti-Westernism. Goebbels complained vehemently about the rival Strasser newspapers to Hitler, and admitted that their success was causing his own Berlin newspapers to be "pushed to the wall". In late April 1930, Hitler publicly and firmly announced his opposition to Gregor Strasser's extreme socialist ideas and appointed Goebbels as Reich leader of NSDAP propaganda.  When Hitler visited Goebbels on 2 May 1930, Goebbels banned the evening edition of the Nationaler Sozialist. Gregor Strasser distanced himself from his brother and relinquished his position as publisher of the Nationaler Sozialist by the end of June, while Otto left the Party at the beginning of July. 

In August 1932, Hitler was offered the job of Vice-Chancellor of Germany by then Chancellor Franz von Papen at the behest of President Paul von Hindenburg, but he refused. Strasser urged him to enter a coalition government, but Hitler saw the offer as placing him in a position of "playing second fiddle". While many in his inner circle, like Goebbels, saw his resistance as heroic, Strasser was frustrated and believed Hitler was wrong to hold out for the Chancellorship. The ideological and personal rivalry with Hitler grew when the successor Chancellor Kurt von Schleicher had discussions with Strasser as to becoming Vice-Chancellor in December 1932. Schleicher hoped to split the NSDAP with Strasser's help, pulling the left wing of the NSDAP to his "national conservative" side to stop Hitler. Hitler was furious and demanded that Strasser refuse Schleicher's offer. At a meeting of Nazi Reichstag members Hitler confronted the 30-40 that supported Strasser, forcing them to publicly support the former and denounce the latter. Strasser resigned from his party offices on 8 December 1932, just seven weeks before the NSDAP obtained political power. Hitler temporarily took over the post of Reichsorganisationsleiter, eventually turning it over to Robert Ley.  On 16 January 1933, Hitler "publicly repudiated Strasser" for his interactions with Schleicher. In March 1933, Strasser officially exited politics by renouncing his Reichstag seat.

Later life

Life after politics
Having renounced his seat in the Reichstag, Strasser sought to return to his pre-politics profession as a pharmacist. Through his own connections and with Hitler's consent he was provided with the opportunity to take up a directorship of Schering-Kahlbaum, a chemical-pharmaceutical company that was the Berlin subsidiary of IG Farben, so long as he promised to cease all political activity, which he did. He detached himself from politics, refusing to meet former political associates and, contrary to some reports, had no contact with his brother Otto's Black Front organisation.

Death
Having achieved national power in January 1933, Hitler and the NSDAP began eliminating all forms of opposition in Germany. In what became known as the Night of the Long Knives, the entire SA leadership was purged, which took place from 30June to 2July 1934. Hitler, along with other top Nazis such as Hermann Göring and Himmler, targeted Ernst Röhm and other SA leaders who, along with some of Hitler's political adversaries, were rounded up, arrested, and shot by members of the Schutzstaffel'' (SS) and Gestapo. Among them was Strasser. Historian Richard Evans surmises that Strasser was most likely killed for having been allegedly offered a position by the predecessor conservative Weimar government, a tie which made him a potential political enemy, due to the personal enmity of Himmler and Göring, both of whom Strasser had been critical of during his role in the party's leadership. Whether Strasser was killed on Hitler's personal orders is not known. He was shot once in the main artery from behind in his cell but did not die immediately. On the orders of SS general Reinhard Heydrich, Strasser was left to bleed to death, which took almost an hour. His brother Otto had emigrated in 1933.

See also
 Strasserism
 List of Nazi Party leaders and officials

References

Citations

Bibliography

External links

Gregor Strasser at the German Historical Museum
Gregor Strasser at the National Library of Germany
 

1892 births
1934 deaths
20th-century Freikorps personnel
Gauleiters
German anti-capitalists
German Army personnel of World War I
German Roman Catholics
German nationalists
IG Farben people
Members of the Reichstag of Nazi Germany
Members of the Reichstag of the Weimar Republic
Military personnel of Bavaria
National Socialist Freedom Movement politicians
National Socialist Working Association members
Nazi Party officials
Nazi Party politicians
Nazis who participated in the Beer Hall Putsch
Nazis executed by Nazi Germany
Nazis executed by firearm
People executed by Nazi Germany by firearm
People from Bavaria executed by Nazi Germany
People from Pfaffenhofen (district)
People from the Kingdom of Bavaria
Recipients of the Iron Cross (1914), 1st class
Strasserism
Third Position
20th-century German newspaper publishers (people)
Victims of the Night of the Long Knives